Cambridge University Cricket Club, first recorded in 1817, is the representative cricket club for students of the University of Cambridge. Depending on the circumstances of each individual match, the club has always been recognised as holding first-class status. The university played List A cricket in 1972 and 1974 only. It has not played top-level Twenty20 cricket.

With some 1,200 members, home matches are played at Fenner's. The club has three men's teams (Blues, Crusaders and the Colleges XI) and one women's team which altogether play nearly 100 days of cricket each season. The inaugural University Match between Cambridge and Oxford University Cricket Club was played in 1827 and the match was the club's sole remaining first class fixture each season until 2020.

The club has also operated as part of the Cambridge University Centre of Cricketing Excellence (Cambridge UCCE) which included players from Cambridge University and was Anglia Polytechnic University, now Anglia Ruskin University. This was re-branded as the Cambridge MCC University (Cambridge MCCU) prior to the 2010 season, when its governance was transferred from the England and Wales Cricket Board to MCC. Both male and female teams play in the British Universities & Colleges Sport competitions and the men also take part in the MCC Universities Championship and Twenty20 competitions.  In 2020, the MCCU competitions were cancelled due to Coronavirus restrictions and funding from MCC ceased.  The MCCU teams played in 2021 as UCCEs once more.  Cambridge UCCE, without support from ARU, competed in the National League against other UCCES, with players selected only from Cambridge University.

The club also oversees and manages the annual inter-college 'Cuppers' cricket competition.

The earliest reference to cricket at the University of Cambridge is in 1710. A Cambridge University team played against an Eton College team in 1754 and 1755, although those were minor matches. It is not known if the Eton teams were of present or past pupils. Cambridge University began an annual series against Cambridge Town Club, which evolved into the original Cambridgeshire County Cricket Club, on 30 May 1817. It is with this game that both teams first acquired first-class status.

All Cambridge teams play annual University Matches against Oxford as well as other matches throughout the Lent and Summer terms. The first team four-day University Match retained its first-class status until 2020 and alternates between being held at Fenner's and The Parks. The one-day match is played at Lord's on the same day as the women's one-day University Match. The Crusaders play a three-day game against the Authentics as well as one-day and Twenty20 games.

Cricket at Cambridge University

Players who represent Cambridge in the university match against Oxford are awarded a "Blue", which recognises sporting achievement at the highest level whilst a student at the university. , Cambridge meets Oxford at Lord's in first-class and limited-overs matches, and a "Blue" is awarded to anyone who plays for Cambridge in either fixture.

Those representing the Second XI (the Crusaders) are eligible for a "Colour" if they represent the Crusaders against Oxford's 'Tics.  Despite a large winter training-squad, and many players representing the university over the summer months (up to 50 players from the training squad and college level) rarely are more than a total of 12 Blues and 12 Colours awarded. Women cricketers are awarded a Half-Blue for playing in the one-day match at Lord's and a discretionary full Blue if any of them meet the relevant criteria laid down by the Blues Committee.

The Quidnuncs club, founded in 1852,
grouped together prominent Cambridge University cricketers.

Recent history
In recent Oxford versus Cambridge University matches, the honours have been fairly even between the two Universities. In 2010 Cambridge University played Oxford in three matches for the first time:  Twenty20, 4-Day First-Class and the 1-Day Match at Lord's (note that colours are not awarded for the Twenty20 game).

The Cambridge Centre of Cricketing Excellence (UCCE) team has played 27 first-class matches between 2001 and 2009.  Subsequently, as the Cambridge Marylebone Cricket Club University, three First Class fixture were played each season until 2014 when this was reduced to two. In 2019, the ECB announced that Cambridge (among other universities) was set to lose its first-class status by 2021.

Grounds
The three grounds that Cambridge University have used for home first-class and List A matches since 1821 are listed below, with statistics complete through to the end of the 2014 season.  Only the first-class and List A matches played at the ground by Cambridge University are recorded in the table.

See also
 List of Cambridge University Cricket Club players
 List of Oxford and Cambridge Universities cricket team players
 List of Cambridge UCCE & MCCU players
 The University Match (cricket)

Bibliography
 
 
 Wisden Cricketers' Almanack, 32nd edition, editor Sydney Pardon, John Wisden & Co., 1895

Further reading
 
 Wisden Cricketers' Almanack, 27th edition, editor Charles F. Pardon, John Wisden & Co., 1890

References

External links

 
 MCC Universities information & history

 
1820 establishments in England
Cricket in Cambridgeshire
English cricket in the 19th century
Former senior cricket clubs
Cricket Club
Sports clubs established in the 1820s
Student cricket in the United Kingdom
Cambridge-related lists
University of Cambridge-related lists
Sports organizations established in 1820